Gavan Reilly (born ) is an Irish journalist working for Newstalk and Virgin Media One. He previously worked at Today FM and TheJournal.ie.

Early life 
Reilly is from Rathmolyon in County Meath. From to 2004 until 2009, Reilly studied at University College Dublin. While there, he was a contributor to The University Observer, a student-run newspaper, as well as Belfield FM, a student-run radio station.

Career
In 2010, Reilly became a staff writer at the news website TheJournal.ie. In 2011 Reilly created Agenda.ie, a website dedicated to covering the schedule and news of Dáil Eireann. In July 2013, Reilly became Today FM's political correspondent. In September 2017 Reilly became the political correspondent for TV3 (which became Virgin Media One in 2018). In March 2019, while retaining his role at VM1, Reilly began presenting a Sunday morning political news programme on Newstalk. In May 2019, Reilly published Enda the Road: Nine Days that Toppled a Taoiseach, a book on the end of Enda Kenny's time as Taoiseach.

References

21st-century Irish people
Alumni of University College Dublin
Irish journalists
Newstalk presenters
People from County Meath
Virgin Media Television (Ireland) presenters

Living people

1980s births
Year of birth uncertain